Radim Breite (born 10 August 1989) is a Czech professional footballer who plays as a midfielder for Sigma Olomouc and the Czechia national team.

Club career
Breite began his professional football career in the Czech First League with FK Teplice. After rarely featuring for Teplice's first team, he spent four seasons in the second division with FK Varnsdorf. By early 2016, Breite had returned to Teplice, and joined rivals FC Slovan Liberec as a mid-season replacement for David Pavelka.

International career
Breite earned selection for the Czech Republic national football team in September 2020, after several players dropped out of the initial squad due to the COVID-19 pandemic. He made his international debut as a substitute on 7 September 2020 in a home match played at the Andrův stadion in Olomouc against Scotland.

Career statistics

International

References

External links

Guardian Football

1989 births
Living people
Czech footballers
Czech Republic international footballers
Association football midfielders
People from Krupka
Czech First League players
FK Teplice players
FK Čáslav players
FK Varnsdorf players
FC Slovan Liberec players
SK Sigma Olomouc players
Sportspeople from the Ústí nad Labem Region